Alex Boyd (born 1969) is a Canadian poet, essayist, editor, and critic.

His essays and articles have appeared in the Globe and Mail, and elsewhere. His first book of poems, Making Bones Walk, was published in 2007.

From 2003 to 2008, he hosted the IV Lounge Reading Series in Toronto, presenting fiction readers alongside poets, and eventually co-editing IV Lounge Nights, an anthology to celebrate the tenth anniversary of the series.

He established Northern Poetry Review, a site for poetry articles and reviews, in April 2006.  In 2008, he established Digital Popcorn, a site for personal film reviews, and has helped launch the Best Canadian Essays series with Tightrope Books, co-editing the first two collections.

His second book of poems The Least Important Man was published by Biblioasis in 2012, and his first novel Army of the Brave and Accidental, a retelling of The Odyssey as modern mythology, was published in 2018 with Nightwood Editions. 

Army of the Brave and Accidental was shortlisted for the 2019 ReLit Award for fiction.

Awards
 2008 Gerald Lampert Award

Works
 Making Bones Walk, (poems) Luna Publications, 2007, 
I.V. Lounge Nights, Editors Myna Wallin, Alex Boyd, Tightrope Books, 2008, 
Best Canadian Essays, 2009, Editors Carmine Starnino, Alex Boyd, Tightrope Books, 2009, 
Best Canadian Essays, 2010, Editors Kamal Al-Solaylee, Alex Boyd, Tightrope Books, 2010, 
''The Least Important Man, (poems) Biblioasis, 2012, 
Army of the Brave and Accidental (novel) Nightwood Editions, 2018

References

External links 
 

Living people
21st-century Canadian poets
1969 births
Canadian male poets
21st-century Canadian male writers